Manuel Nocciolini (born 18 May 1989) is an Italian footballer who plays as a forward for  club Taranto on loan from Giugliano.

Biography
He made his debut on the professional level in the 2008–09 season for the Lega Pro Seconda Divisione team Cuoiopelli Cappiano. Before leaving Fiorentina, he was awarded the jersey no. 39 of the first team. In 2009 Nocciolini left for Pisa in a temporary deal, winning with them Group D of 2009–10 Serie D.

In mid-2010 Nocciolini was signed by Gavorrano. Free transfer, in October 2014, agreed to a move to Montichiari; after only two months he is transferred to Ribelle. In the 2015-2016 season he was hired by Forlì, where he scored 25 goals, becoming the second top-scorer for Group D of Serie D. In the summer of 2016 he signed for Parma, competing in Lega Pro.

On 7 August 2020 he moved to Sambenedettese on loan. Sambenedettese was obligated to purchase his rights if they were to be promoted to Serie B at the end of the 2020–21 season.

On 1 February 2021 he moved on another loan to Serie C club Renate, again with an obligation for Renate to purchase him in case of the promotion to Serie B.

On 19 August 2021, he joined Monopoli on a one-year deal with an option for the second year. On 20 January 2022, he was loaned to Grosseto.

On 25 August 2022, Nocciolini signed a two-year contract with Giugliano. On 31 January 2023, he was loaned by Taranto.

References

External links
 

1989 births
People from Piombino
Sportspeople from the Province of Livorno
Footballers from Tuscany
Living people
Italian footballers
Italy youth international footballers
Association football forwards
ACF Fiorentina players
Pisa S.C. players
U.S. Gavorrano players
A.C. Montichiari players
Forlì F.C. players
Parma Calcio 1913 players
Pordenone Calcio players
Ravenna F.C. players
A.S. Sambenedettese players
A.C. Renate players
S.S. Monopoli 1966 players
F.C. Grosseto S.S.D. players
S.S.C. Giugliano players
Taranto F.C. 1927 players
Serie B players
Serie C players
Serie D players